Albert Longdon (1 November 1865 — 13 May 1937) was an English cricketer. He was a right-handed batsman and a right-arm medium-pace bowler who played for Nottinghamshire. He was born in Greasley, Nottinghamshire and died in Bentley, West Riding of Yorkshire.

Longdon made two first-class appearances within a week, during the 1895 County Championship season. Despite scoring 20 not out in his first innings, he was taken out for a duck in the second innings.

External links
Albert Longdon at Cricket Archive 

1865 births
1937 deaths
English cricketers
Nottinghamshire cricketers
People from the Borough of Broxtowe
Cricketers from Nottinghamshire
People from the Metropolitan Borough of Doncaster